Richard Neal (September 2, 1947 - April 5, 1983) was an American football defensive end in the National Football League for the New Orleans Saints and the New York Jets. Neal played college football at Southern University. He was traded along with Delles Howell from the Saints to the Jets for a pair of 1973 picks in the second and third rounds (51st and 66th overall–Steve Baumgartner and Pete Van Valkenburg respectively) on January 29, 1973. He died of heart failure at the age of 35 in St. Louis. He was on a business trip for his company at his death.

References

External links
New York Times obituary

1947 births
1983 deaths
Sportspeople from Minden, Louisiana
American football defensive ends
Southern Jaguars football players
New Orleans Saints players
New York Jets players
Deaths from congestive heart failure